Rainer Müller (born 30 July 1946) is a former German cyclist. He competed for West Germany in the tandem event at the 1972 Summer Olympics.

References

External links
 

1946 births
Living people
German male cyclists
Olympic cyclists of West Germany
Cyclists at the 1972 Summer Olympics
Cyclists from Berlin